The claw finding problem is a classical problem in complexity theory, with several applications in cryptography. In short, given two functions f, g, viewed as oracles, the problem is to find x and y such as f(x) = g(y). The pair (x, y) is then called a claw. Some problems, especially in cryptography, are best solved when viewed as a claw finding problem, hence any algorithmic improvement to solving the claw finding problem provides a better attack on cryptographic primitives such as hash functions.

Definition
A pair  is called a claw if . The claw finding problem is defined as to find such a claw, given that one exists.

If we view  as random functions, we expect a claw to exist iff . So if , the expected number of claws is at least 1.

Algorithms
If classical computers are used, the best algorithm is similar to a Meet-in-the-middle attack, first described by Diffie and Hellman. The algorithm works as follows: assume . If such an index exists, we found a claw. This approach takes time  and memory .

If quantum computers are used, Seiichiro Tani showed that a claw can be found in complexity .

Shengyu Zhang showed that asymptotically these algorithms are the most efficient possible.

Applications
As noted, most applications of the claw finding problem appear in cryptography. Examples include:
 Collision finding on cryptographic hash functions.
 Meet-in-the-middle attacks: using this technique, k bits of round keys can be found in time roughly 2k/2+1. Here f is encrypting halfway through and g is decrypting halfway through. This is why Triple DES applies DES three times and not just two.

References

Computational complexity theory
Quantum complexity theory
Probabilistic complexity classes